Mental factors ( or chitta samskara ; ; Tibetan: སེམས་བྱུང sems byung), in Buddhism, are identified within the teachings of the Abhidhamma (Buddhist psychology). They are defined as aspects of the mind that apprehend the quality of an object, and that have the ability to color the mind. Within the Abhidhamma, the mental factors are categorized as formations concurrent with mind. Alternate translations for mental factors include "mental states", "mental events", and "concomitants of consciousness".

Introduction
Mental factors are aspects of the mind that apprehend the quality of an object and have the ability to color the mind. Geshe Tashi Tsering explains:
The Tibetan for mental factors, semlay jungwa chö (Skt. chaitasika dharma), means phenomena arising from the mind, suggesting that the mental factors are not primary to the mind but arise within a larger framework. A mental factor, again, is defined as the aspect of the mind that apprehends a particular quality of an object. Because it is characterized by the qualities of activity and non-neutrality, it has the ability to color the mind in dependence on the way it manifests. Hence, a feeling of desire from seeing what is conceived as a beautiful object affects the other mental factors that are present at that time, and this colors the whole mind.

The relationship between the main mind (Sanskrit: citta) and the mental factors can be described by the following metaphors:
 The main mind is like screen in a cinema, and the mental factors are like the images projected on the screen. In this analogy, we typically do not notice the screen because we are so caught up on the images.
 The main mind is like a king who sits passively on a throne, and the mental factors are like the king's busy ministers.

Traleg Rinpoche states that the main distinction between the mind and mental factors is that the mind apprehends an object as a whole, whereas mental factors apprehend an object in its particulars.

Lists of mental factors
Within Buddhism, there are many different systems of abhidharma (commonly referred to as Buddhist psychology), and each system contains its own list of the most significant mental factors. These lists vary from system to system both in the number of mental factors listed, and in the definitions that are given for each mental factor. These lists are not considered to be exhaustive; rather they present significant categories and mental factors that are useful to study in order to understand how the mind functions.

Some of the main commentaries on the Abhidharma systems that are studied today include:
 Abhidhammattha-sangaha by Acariya Anuruddha – a Theravada commentary that lists fifty-two mental factors.
 Atthasālinī by Buddhaghosa – a Theravada commentary that provides explanations for fifty-two mental factors.
 Abhidharmakośa by Vasubandhu – a Sarvastivada commentary (studied by the Mahayana schools) that lists forty-two mental factors.
 Abhidharma-samuccaya by Asanga – a Yogachara commentary (studied by the Mahayana schools) that lists fifty-one mental factors.
 Innermost Core of Topics of Knowledge (mDzod-phug) by Shenrab Miwo – a Tibetan Bon commentary that lists fifty-one factors.

Sthaviravāda Sarvastivada tradition
The number of mental factors varies in different Sarvastivada works.
The Abhidharmakośa lists 42 mental factors which include:

Ten factors arising with every mind (mahābhūmika)
 Vedanā – feeling
 Saṃjñā – perception
 Cetanā – volition
 Sparśa – contact 
 Chanda – desire (to act)
 Prajñā – wisdom
 Smṛti – mindfulness
 Manasikāra – attention
 Adhimokṣa – decision
 Samādhi – mental concentration. it also called Ekaggata, one-pointedness

Ten factors arising with every good mind (kuśalamahābhūmikā)
 Śraddhā – faith
 Vīrya – energy
 Hrī – shame at doing evil
 Apatrāpya – decorum, regard for consequence
 Alobha – non-attachment
 Adveṣa – non-aggression
 Praśrabdhi – calmness
 Upekṣā – equanimity
 Appamāda – conscientiousness
 Ahiṃsā – non-injuriousness

Six factors arising with every defiled mind (kleśamahābhūmika)
 Moha – delusion
 Pramāda – heedlessness, carelessness, unconcern
 Kauśīdya – laziness, slothfulness
 Āśraddhya – lack of faith, lack of trust
 Styāna – lethargy, gloominess
 Auddhatya – excitement, ebullience

Two factors arising with every bad mind (akusalamahābhūmika)
 Āhrīkya - shamelessness
 Anapatrapya - disregard

Ten factors arising with defiled mind to a limited extent (parittaklesabhūmika)
 Krodha - anger
 Mrakśa - hypocrisy
 Mātsarya - selfishness
 Īrṣyā - envy
 Pradāśa - spite
 Vihiṃsā - violence
 Upanāha - vengefulness
 Śāṭhya - craftiness
 Māyā - deceit
 Mada - pride

Four indeterminate factors (aniyatabhūmika)
These factors can be associated with good, bad or neutral mind.
 kaukritya - regret
 Middha - sleepiness
 Vitarka - initial thought
 Vicāra - sustained thought

Theravāda Abhidhamma tradition
Within the Theravāda Abhidhamma tradition, the Abhidhammattha-sangaha enumerates the fifty-two mental factors listed below:

Note that this list is not exhaustive; there are other mental factors mentioned in the Theravada teachings. This list identifies fifty-two important factors that help to understand how the mind functions.

Seven universal mental factors
The seven universal mental factors (sabbacittasādhāraṇa cetasikas) are common (sādhāraṇa) to all consciousness (sabbacitta). Bhikkhu Bodhi states: "These factors perform the most rudimentary and essential cognitive functions, without which consciousness of an object would be utterly impossible."

These seven factors are:
 Phassa – contact 
 Vedanā – feeling
 Saññā – perception
 Cetanā – volition
 Ekaggata – one-pointedness
 Jīvitindriya – life faculty
 Manasikāra – attention

Six occasional mental factors
The six occasional or particular mental factors (pakiṇṇaka cetasikas) are ethically variable mental factors found only in certain consciousnesses. They are:
 Vitakka – Application of thought
 Vicāra – Examining
 Adhimokkha – Decision
 Viriya – Energy
 Pīti – Rapture
 Chanda – Desire (to act)

Fourteen unwholesome mental factors
The unwholesome mental factors (akusala cetasikas) accompany the unwholesome consciousnesses (akusala citta).

The fourteen unwholesome mental factors are:
 Four universal unwholesome mental factors (akusalasādhāraṇa):
 Moha – delusion 
 Ahirika – lack of shame
 Anottappa – disregard for consequence
 Uddhacca – restlessness
 Three mental factors of the greed-group (lobha):
 Lobha – greed
 Diṭṭhi – wrong view
 Māna – conceit
 Four mental factors of the hatred-group (dosa)
 Dosa – hatred
 Issā – envy
 Macchariya – miserliness
 Kukkucca – regret
 Other unwholesome mental factors
 Thīna – sloth
 Middha – torpor
 Vicikicchā – doubt

Bhikkhu Bodhi states:
Unwholesome consciousness (akusalacitta) is consciousness accompanied by one or another of the three unwholesome roots—greed, hatred, and delusion. Such consciousness is called unwholesome because it is mentally unhealthy, morally blameworthy, and productive of painful results.

Twenty-five beautiful mental factors
The beautiful mental factors (sobhana cetasikas) accompany the wholesome consciousnesses (kusala citta).

The twenty-five beautiful mental factors (sobhana cetasikas) are:
 Nineteen universal beautiful mental factors (sobhanasādhāraṇa):
 Saddhā – faith
 Sati – mindfulness
 Hiri – shame at doing evil
 Ottappa – regard for consequence
 Alobha – lack of greed
 Adosa – lack of hatred
 Tatramajjhattatā – balance, neutrality of mind
 Kāyapassaddhi  – tranquility of mental body
 Cittapassaddhi  – tranquility of consciousness
 Kāyalahutā – lightness of mental body
 Cittalahutā – lightness of consciousness
 Kāyamudutā – malleability/softness of mental body
 Cittamudutā – malleability/softness of consciousness
 Kāyakammaññatā – wieldiness of mental body
 Cittakammaññatā – wieldiness of consciousness
 Kāyapāguññatā – proficiency of mental body
 Cittapāguññatā – proficiency of consciousness
 Kāyujukatā – straightness/rectitude of mental body
 Cittujukatā – straightness/rectitude of consciousness
 Three Abstinences (virati):
 Sammāvācā – right speech
 Sammākammanta – right action
 Sammā-ājīva – right livelihood
 Two Immeasurables (appamañña):
 Karuṇā – compassion
 Mudita – sympathetic joy
 One Faculty of wisdom (paññindriya):
 Paññā – wisdom

Bhikkhu Bodhi states:
Wholesome consciousness (kusalacitta) is consciousness accompanied by the wholesome roots—non-greed or generosity, non-hatred or loving-kindness, and non-delusion or wisdom. Such consciousness is mentally healthy, morally blameless, and productive of pleasant results.

Abhidharma tradition according to the Mahayana taken from Hiniyana system
Abhidharma studies in the Mahayana tradition are based on the Sanskrit Sarvāstivāda abhidharma system. Within this system, the Abhidharma-samuccaya identifies fifty-one mental factors:

Five universal mental factors 
The five universal mental factors (sarvatraga) are:
 Sparśa – contact, contacting awareness, sense impression, touch
 Vedanā – feeling, sensation
 Saṃjñā – perception
 Cetanā – volition, intention
 Manasikāra – attention

These five mental factors are referred to as universal or omnipresent because they operate in the wake of every mind situation. If any one of these factors is missing, then the experience of the object is incomplete. For example:
 If there is no sparśa (contact), then there would be no basis for perception.
 If there is no vedana (feeling, sensation), there is no relishing of the object.
 If there is no saṃjñā (perception), then the specific characteristic of the object is not perceived.
 If there is no cetanā (volition), then there is no movement towards and settling on the object.
 If there is no manasikāra (attention), then there is not holding onto the object.

Five object-determining mental factors 
The five object-determining mental factors (viṣayaniyata) are:
 Chanda – desire (to act), intention, interest
 Adhimokṣa – decision, interest, firm conviction
 Smṛti – mindfulness
 Prajñā – wisdom
 Samādhi – concentration

The five factors are referred to as object-determining is because these factors each grasp the specification of the object. When they are steady, there is certainty concerning each object.

Eleven virtuous mental factors
The eleven virtuous (kuśala) mental factors are:
 Sraddhā – faith
 Hrī – self-respect, conscientiousness, sense of shame
 Apatrāpya – decorum, regard for consequence
 Alobha – non-attachment
 Adveṣa – non-aggression, equanimity, lack of hatred
 Amoha – non-bewilderment
 Vīrya – diligence, effort
 Praśrabdhi – pliancy, mental-flexibility 
 Apramāda – conscientiousness
 Upekṣa – equanimity
 Ahiṃsā – nonharmfulness

Six root unwholesome factors
The six root unwholesome factors (mūlakleśa) are:
 Rāga – attachment
 Pratigha – anger
 Avidya – ignorance
 Māna – pride, conceit
 Vicikitsa – doubt
 Dṛṣṭi – wrong view

Twenty secondary unwholesome factors 
The twenty secondary unwholesome factors (upakleśa) are:
Krodha – rage, fury
Upanāha – resentment
Mrakśa – concealment, slyness-concealment
Pradāśa – spitefulness
Īrṣyā – envy, jealousy
Mātsarya – stinginess, avarice, miserliness
Māyā – pretense, deceit
Śāṭhya – hypocrisy, dishonesty
Mada – self-infatuation, mental inflation, self-satisfaction
Vihiṃsā – malice, hostility, cruelty, intention to harm
Āhrīkya – lack of shame, lack of conscience, shamelessness
Anapatrāpya – lack of propriety, disregard, shamelessness
Styāna – lethargy, gloominess
Auddhatya – excitement, ebullience
Āśraddhya – lack of faith, lack of trust
Kauśīdya – laziness, slothfulness
Pramāda – heedlessness, carelessness, unconcern
Muṣitasmṛtitā – forgetfulness
Asaṃprajanya  – non-alertness, inattentiveness
Vikṣepa – distraction, desultoriness

Four changeable mental factors 
The four changeable mental factors (aniyata) are:
Kaukṛitya – regret, worry,
Middha – sleep, drowsiness
Vitarka – conception, selectiveness, examination
Vicāra – discernment, discursiveness, analysis

Alternate translations
Alternate translations for the term mental factors (Sanskrit: caitasika) include:
 Mental factors (Geshe Tashi Tsering, Jeffrey Hopkins, Bhikkhu Bodhi, N.K.G. Mendis)
 Mental events (Herbert Guenther)
 Mental states (Erik Pema Kunzang, Nārada Thera)
 Concomitants (N.K.G. Mendis)
 Concomitants of consciousness (Bhikkhu Bodhi)
 Subsidiary awareness (Alexander Berzin)

See also
 Kleshas (Buddhism)
 Saṅkhāra
 Three poisons (Buddhism)

Notes

References

Sources
 Berzin, Alexander (2006). Primary Minds and the 51 Mental Factors. Study Buddhism.
 Bhikkhu Bodhi (1995–1012). A Comprehensive Manual of Abhidhamma. Buddhist Publication Society.
 Geshe Tashi Tsering (2006). Buddhist Psychology: The Foundation of Buddhist Thought. Perseus Books Group. Kindle Edition.
 Goleman, Daniel (2008). Destructive Emotions: A Scientific Dialogue with the Dalai Lama. Bantam. Kindle Edition.
 Guenther, Herbert V. &  Leslie S. Kawamura (1975), Mind in Buddhist Psychology: A Translation of Ye-shes rgyal-mtshan's "The Necklace of Clear Understanding". Dharma Publishing. Kindle Edition.
 Kunsang, Erik Pema (translator) (2004). Gateway to Knowledge, Vol. 1. North Atlantic Books.
 Nārada Thera. Abhidhammattha-sangaha
 Traleg Rinpoche (1993). The Abhidharmasamuccaya: Teachings by the Venerable Traleg Kyabgon Rinpoche. The Kagyu E-Vam Buddhist Institute.

External links

Mahayana mental factors:
 Introduction to the Mind and Mental Factors by Alexander Berzin
 Primary Minds and the 51 Mental Factors by Alexander Berzin
 Developing the Mind Based on Buddha-Nature, Session Two: Primary Consciousness and Mental Factors, Alexander Berzin
 Mind and Mental Factors by Venerable Thubten Chodron
 Rigpa wiki entry for mental factors

Theravada mental factors:
 Cetisakas by Nina von Gorkom
 Introducing the Buddhist Abhidharma, Appendix 2 – Cetasika by U KYAW MIN

Theravada Abhidharma:
 A Comprehensive Manual of Abhidhamma
 Abhidhammattha-sangaha

Definitions for "caitikas" or "cetisakas"
 Berzin Archives glossary entry for "sems byung (Skt: caitika)"
 A Dictionary of Buddhism, entry for caitta
 Ranjung Yeshe wiki entry for sems byung

Virtue